Discovery is the debut studio album by K-pop girl group, Jewelry. It was released on March 30, 2001 on Star Empire Entertainment.

Overview 
Discovery marks the start of Jewelry's career. Members of the group at this time were Park Jung-ah, Lee Ji-hyun, Jung Yoo-jin, and Jun Eun-mi. Jewelry's current image was  lovable and cutesy, and the album was full of cute pop songs about love and relationships. Because of the simplistic concept of the album, sales were less than spectacular, and is deemed as Jewelry's worst album to date, mainly because of the poor vocals, and Park Jung Ah's vocals were heavily emphasized, while the other members vocals were blended together as one. Promoted songs from this album were 사랑해 (I Love You) and 이젠 (Yet). After promotion of the album was finished, Jung Yoo Jin and Jun Eun Mi were replaced with Cho Min-ah and Seo In-young, and the new formation begun working on their next album.

Track listings in 

"하늘같은 사랑"
"사랑해"
"이젠"
"달콤한 상상"
"작은 바램"
"Say"
"Heart"
"Say Yes"
"Forever"
"소나기"
"날 믿어요"
"Happy end"

Promoted songs 
사랑해 (I Love You)
이젠 (Yet)

See also 
 Jewelry
 Park Jung-ah
 Seo In-young

References 

Jewelry (group) albums
2001 debut albums
Korean-language albums